Yalpara Conservation Park is a protected area located in the Australian state of South Australia in the locality of Yalpara about  north of the state capital of Adelaide and about  north-east of Orroroo.

The conservation park occupies land in section 112 of the cadastral unit of the Hundred of Yalpara. It was proclaimed on 10 June 1976 under the National Parks and Wildlife Act 1972 in order to preserve “an example of rangeland country”.

In 1980, the conservation park was described as being on “relatively flat terrain”, as having vegetation consisting of “an open woodland of Eucalyptus socialis with Myoporum platycarpum over an open shrubland understorey of Atriplex, Kochia and  numerous introduced species” and that it was in “a degraded state, having suffered heavy grazing.”

The conservation park is classified as an IUCN Category III protected area.  It was listed on the now-defunct Register of the National Estate.

See also
Protected areas of South Australia

References

External links
Yalpara Conservation Park webpage on the Protected Planet website

Conservation parks of South Australia
Protected areas established in 1976
1976 establishments in Australia
South Australian places listed on the defunct Register of the National Estate